The Sacramento State Marching Band is the official marching band at California State University, Sacramento. The Band was formed in 1956, and until 1996 was known as the Sacramento State Marching Musicians. To this day the band performs at all home football games and various away games during the football season. The Band also functions as the de facto student cheering section at athletic events. The Band also is present every year during The Causeway Classic against arch-rival UC Davis. In 2008, Dr. Clay Redfield, became the first alumnus to ever lead the band. In 2018 Santiago Sabado, also an alumnus, took over as the director.

The 2018 season marked the 60th Anniversary of the SSMB.

Membership
The SSMB is composed primarily of students from Sacramento State. Membership is open to anyone who can march and play an instrument. However students wishing to join the drum line must audition for placement.

The Sacramento State Hornet Revue
The Sacramento State Hornet Revue is the smaller subset of the marching band and usually performs as the official pep band. The Hornet Revue performs at home volleyball and basketball games and also various public venues outside the university.

Traditions

Marching Style
The Sacramento State Marching Band marches the glide step style.

The Rivalry
The Band strives to keep the Sac State-UC Davis rivalry alive, which is highlighted each year at the annual Causeway Classic.

Trooping
Trooping is a tradition of the SSMB performed usually during game days, parade performances, or other school functions. The Band marches in parade block formation usually accompanied by the colorguard along with Sacramento State Cheer Team and Dance Team. During Trooping, the Drum Line plays its signature "Rumble" Cadence and the band stops and plays for tailgaters prior to home football games.

Repertoire
The band's musical repertoire consists of various classic rock, jazz, funk, grunge, metal, Latin and pop tunes, as well as the school's fight song, "Fight Hornet Fight".

See also 
 University of Montana Grizzly Marching Band (Another Big Sky Conference marching band)

External links
 Sacramento State Marching Band Homepage

College marching bands in the United States
California State University, Sacramento
Musical groups established in 1958
1958 establishments in California